Strode-Morrison-Tabler House and Farm is a historic home located near Hedgesville, Berkeley County, West Virginia. It is a farmhouse of brick, limestone, and wood construction that began in 1752 as a single-story, side-gable, two-bay cottage of rubble limestone that subsequently underwent several additions during the 19th century.  These additions include a brick upper story added to the original house and a three-bay, limestone addition constructed about 1830. This limestone addition became the principal section of the house.  A wood-frame addition was built along the rear of the house by the end of the 19th century.  Also on the property are four sheds / outbuildings (c. 1920–1950), a garage (c. 1930), and barn complex (c. 1752 and later).

It was listed on the National Register of Historic Places in 2006.

References

Houses on the National Register of Historic Places in West Virginia
Houses completed in 1752
Houses in Berkeley County, West Virginia
National Register of Historic Places in Berkeley County, West Virginia